The Naval Military Academy, at Marín, Pontevedra, in north-western Spain, is a coeducational naval academy that educates officers for commissioning primarily into the Spanish Navy and Spanish Navy Marines.

History 

It was established in 1717 as Real Compañía de Guardias Marinas (Royal Company of Maritime Guards) in Cádiz by José Patiño. In 1769 the institution moved to San Fernando, and in 1943 to its present location.

References

External links
  Official Webpage

Educational institutions established in 1943
Military academies of Spain
Naval academies
Spanish Navy
1943 establishments in Spain
Pontevedra Campus